Ronald F. Kozlicki (born December 12, 1944) is an American former professional basketball player. He played college basketball at Northwestern University. Kozlicki was selected in both the 1967 NBA draft and ABA Draft by the San Diego Rockets and Indiana Pacers, respectively. He chose to play in the ABA for the Pacers during the 1967–68 season and appeared in 37 games while averaging 2.9 points and 1.9 rebounds per game.

References

1944 births
Living people
American men's basketball players
Indiana Pacers draft picks
Indiana Pacers players
Northwestern Wildcats men's basketball players
People from Palatine, Illinois
San Diego Rockets draft picks
Small forwards
Basketball players from Chicago